Gamay, officially the Municipality of Gamay, is a 4th class municipality in the province of Northern Samar, Philippines. According to the 2020 census, it has a population of 23,367 people.

In the east, it is bounded by the Pacific Ocean, in the south by Lapinig, in the north-west by Mapanas and Catubig.

Geography

Barangays
Gamay is politically subdivided into 26 barangays.

Climate

Demographics

Economy

References

External links
 [ Philippine Standard Geographic Code]
 Philippine Census Information
 Local Governance Performance Management System 

Municipalities of Northern Samar